The Complete 1957 Riverside Recordings is a 2006 release of Thelonious Monk and John Coltrane's work for the Riverside Records label in 1957, with two tracks previously unreleased.

This collection is an almost complete anthology of the work of Monk and Coltrane, who only recorded together in the studio during 1957. The set draws from tracks recorded for  Thelonious Monk with John Coltrane, Monk's Music and a trio track from Thelonious Himself.

Thelonious Monk Quartet with John Coltrane at Carnegie Hall and Discovery! are the only other recordings documenting Monk and Coltrane's work together.

Track listing

CD 1

 "Monk's Mood (False start)" (Monk) – 0:55
 "Monk's Mood" (Monk) – 7:52
 "Crepuscule with Nellie (Take 1)" (Monk) – 4:34
 "Crepuscule with Nellie (Take 2)" (Monk) – 4:42
 "Crepuscule with Nellie (Breakdown)" (Monk) – 0:55
 "Blues for Tomorrow" (Gigi Gryce)  – 13:33
 "Crepuscule with Nellie (Edited, retakes 4 & 5)" (Monk) – 4:46
 "Crepuscule with Nellie (Retake 6)" (Monk) – 4:39
 "Off Minor (Take 4)" (Monk) – 5:15
 "Off Minor (Take 5)" (Monk) – 5:07

CD 2

 "Abide with Me (Take 1)" (William Henry Monk) – 0:54
 "Abide with Me (Take 2)" (William Henry Monk) – 0:54
 "Epistrophy (Short)" (Monk, Kenny Clarke) – 3:09
 "Epistrophy" (Monk, Kenny Clarke) – 10:46
 "Well, You Needn't (Opening)" (Monk) – 1:26
 "Well You Needn't" (Monk) – 11:23
 "Ruby, My Dear (Hawkins)" (Monk) – 5:25
 "Ruby, My Dear (Trane)" (Monk) – 6:21
 "Nutty" (Monk) – 6:38
 "Trinkle, Tinkle" (Monk) – 6:39

Personnel

Thelonious Monk - piano
John Coltrane - tenor saxophone
Coleman Hawkins - tenor saxophone
Gigi Gryce - alto saxophone
Ray Copeland - trumpet
Wilbur Ware - upright bass
Art Blakey - drums
Shadow Wilson - drums

References

Hard bop compilation albums
Thelonious Monk albums
John Coltrane compilation albums
2006 compilation albums
Riverside Records compilation albums